Red chamber may refer to:

 Dream of the Red Chamber, an 18th-century Chinese novel by Cao Xueqin
 A informal term for the Senate of Canada, properly the chamber where it meets
 Legislative Council of Quebec's convening hall

See also
 Green chamber (disambiguation)
 Red hall (disambiguation)
 Red room (disambiguation)